Amy Lee White (born October 20, 1968), later known by her married name Amy Ballidis, is an American former competition swimmer and Olympic medalist.  She represented the United States as a 15-year-old at the 1984 Summer Olympics in Los Angeles, California.  She received a silver medal for her second-place performance in the women's 200-meter backstroke, finishing with a time of 2:13.04, behind Dutch swimmer Jolanda de Rover.

See also
 List of Olympic medalists in swimming (women)
 List of Southern Methodist University people

References

External links

 

1968 births
Living people
American female backstroke swimmers
Olympic silver medalists for the United States in swimming
Sportspeople from Redondo Beach, California
SMU Mustangs women's swimmers
Swimmers at the 1983 Pan American Games
Swimmers at the 1984 Summer Olympics
Medalists at the 1984 Summer Olympics
Pan American Games gold medalists for the United States
Pan American Games medalists in swimming
Medalists at the 1983 Pan American Games